The Levant Front (Jabhat al-Shamiyah, also translated as the Sham Front or the Levantine Front) is a Syrian rebel group based around Aleppo involved in the Syrian Civil War. It was formed in December 2014.

The northern branch of the Levant Front is part of the Turkish-backed Syrian National Army. The Netherlands' public prosecutor declared it to be a terrorist organisation in 2018, despite the Dutch government having earlier provided it with support.

Ideology

The Levant Front's membership includes the major Sunni Islamist groups operating in northern Syria, representing a spectrum of ideologies from hardline Salafism to apolitical factions linked to the Free Syrian Army. The group imposes Sharia law where murder and apostasy in Islam are punishable by death. In Aleppo, media activists accusing the Levant Front of corruption and otherwise criticizing the group have received threats and faced reprisal attacks. Courts affiliated with the group have also been accused of summary killings by Amnesty International.

History

Initial formation
Following months of negotiations in Turkey and northern Syria between the Islamic Front (mainly the al-Tawhid Brigade), the Army of Mujahideen, the Nour al-Din al-Zenki Movement, the Fastaqim Union, Liwa Ahrar Souriya and the Authenticity and Development Front, on 25 December 2014, the factions announced that they combined their forces into a joint command called the Levant Front. The US-backed Hazzm Movement joined the coalition on 30 January 2015, and announced its dissolution and merger with into other Levant Front factions on 1 March 2015.

On 20 February 2015, the Levant Front successfully forced Syrian Army forces to retreat from rural towns in Aleppo; during the clashes group claimed to have killed 300 Syrian soldiers and captured 110. During the same month, the group signed an agreement with the YPG and installed Sharia courts in Sheikh Maqsood and Afrin.

Dissolution and reestablishment in 2015

On 18 April 2015, the Levant Front announced its dissolution as an alliance, however it stated that the member factions would continue to coordinate with each other militarily. Reasons behind the split were believed to include a lack of coordination between the groups and increasing defections of its members to other factions. Following its end as a single unified group, it continued to act as a joint operations room.

On 26 April 2015, along with other major Aleppo based groups, the Levant Front established the Fatah Halab joint operations room.

Between May and June 2015, the Trotskyist Leon Sedov Brigade joined the Levant Front. In June 2016, it largely separated from the group, before completely leaving in October 2016.

The group announced its reactivation on 18 June. Its new leader is Abu Amr, who was an Ahrar ash-Sham commander. On 29 June, the Levant Front released their charter.

Since its reactivation on 18 June, the Levant Front operates as a unified group with former members acting as independent groups. Various groups have joined and left the group since its reactivation, such as Abu Amara Battalions and the Thuwar al-Sham Battalions.

SDF offensive against the Levant Front
On 16 November 2015, the Syrian Democratic Forces announced the formation of its branch in the Aleppo and Idlib governorates. The YPG, YPJ, and the Army of Revolutionaries were the founding members of the coalition. Subsequently, clashes erupted between the SDF and the Levant Front, comprising Ahrar al-Sham, the al-Nusra Front, and the Mare' Operations Room.

On 10 February 2016, the SDF successfully drove out the Levant Front from the Menagh Military Airbase. After days of fierce clashes, the YPG and the Army of Revolutionaries captured a series of villages before reaching and capturing the airbase and the town of Menagh from the Levant Front. According to sources quoted by Reuters, the SDF were supported by Russian airstrikes. The SDF initiated this offensive following the recent Syrian Army offensive on rebel forces in Aleppo supported by Russian airstrikes. The SDF advanced from the Afrin Canton, the westernmost part of Rojava, which had been attacked multiple times by Islamist groups such as the al-Nusra Front. The aim was to prevent attacks on Afrin canton and close the Turkish border to these various Islamist groups.

Turkish intervention and rebel infighting

On 24 August 2016, Turkey launched a large-scale military campaign in the northern Aleppo Governorate against both ISIL and the SDF. The Levant Front's northern branch was one of the Syrian National Army factions (SNA) that participated in the operation, which captured Jarabulus, al-Bab, and dozens of other towns in northern Aleppo.

On 24 January 2017, the al-Nusra Front backed by Nour al-Din al-Zenki attacked the Army of Mujahideen and the Levant Front west of Aleppo, defeating both. The former two groups then merged with several other Islamist factions and declared the formation of Tahrir al-Sham. The Levant Front's western Aleppo branch and several other former Levant Front groups, such as the Army of Mujahideen and the Fastaqim Union, joined Ahrar al-Sham.

In July 2017, the Levant Front's northern branch attacked its former ally and co-SNA group, the Descendants of Saladin Brigade, kidnapping its leader and raiding its bases with other SNA units. This followed the Descendants of Saladin Brigade's declaration that it would not take part in a planned Turkish-led offensive against Afrin Canton, which is ruled by the secular, Kurdish-dominated PYD. The Levant Front reportedly justified this operation by claiming that the Descendants of Saladin Brigade's leader Mahmoud Khallo was an al-Qaeda member and allied to the PYD; according to Khallo, the Levant Front tortured him until he was handed over to the Turkish security forces.

Foreign support 
The government of the Netherlands provided materials to the Levant Front as part of a program of non-lethal assistance for 22 rebel groups in Syria from 2015 to 2018. In September 2018, the Dutch public prosecution department declared the Levant Front to be a "criminal organisation of terrorist intent", describing it as a "salafist and jihadistic" group that "strives for the setting up of the caliphate".

In an interview an official from the group stated that the Levant Front takes ISIL members and their families captive and will sell them to foreign governments and intelligence agencies for revenue, among the nations listed included the United States and United Arab Emirates, rewards for captured ISIL members are over 10 million USD and the transactions are arranged by brokers and Turkish officials.

See also
 List of armed groups in the Syrian Civil War

References

Anti-government factions of the Syrian civil war
Free Syrian Army
Anti-ISIL factions in Syria
Military units and formations established in 2014
Syrian National Army
Turkish supported militant groups of the Syrian civil war